Lillian Irene Hayman (July 17, 1922 – October 25, 1994) was an American actress and singer.

Career
Born in Baltimore, Maryland, Hayman graduated from Wilberforce University with a BA before she began her career in the Broadway theatre.

She won the 1968 Tony Award for Best Supporting Actress in a Musical, playing the mother of Leslie Uggams's character in the play Hallelujah, Baby!. 

This performance attracted the casting agents for One Life to Live, who cast her as Sadie Gray. 
Hayman played Sadie Gray from 1968 until 1986. Hayman briefly left the cast of One Life to Live to appear in the primetime musical comedy series The Leslie Uggams Show. She also appeared in the 1971 Broadway production of the Kander and Ebb musical 70, Girls, 70.

Hayman's One Life to Live option was not renewed in 1986 by then-executive producer Paul Rauch. According to co-star Ellen Holly's 1998 memoir, One Life: The Autobiography of an African American Actress, Hayman didn't even know that she had been fired until Rauch's assistant approached her in the parking garage as she was leaving the studio and walking to her Tercel: "Mr. Rauch wants you to know that you just worked your last day." 

Hayman also portrayed Lucrezia Borgia in the 1975 film Mandingo, and made her final feature film appearance in that film's 1976 sequel, Drum.

Death
On October 25, 1994, Hayman died of a heart attack at her home in Hollis, Queens, New York. She was 72 years old.

Filmography

References

External links
 
 

African-American actresses
American soap opera actresses
American film actresses
American television actresses
American stage actresses
American musical theatre actresses
Actresses from New York City
Actresses from Baltimore
Tony Award winners
Wilberforce University alumni
1922 births
1994 deaths
People from Hollis, Queens
20th-century American actresses
20th-century African-American women singers